The 2010 Rali Vinho da Madeira (Madeira Wine Rally), was the eighth round of the 2010 Intercontinental Rally Challenge (IRC) season. The 21 stage asphalt rally took place on the island of Madeira between 5 – 7 August 2010 with all stages running in daylight.

Introduction
The rally was based in Funchal, which is the largest city on the island of Madeira. The Thursday evening had a single stage, the  Avenida Do Mar stage, which was the only stage that was run once during the event. Friday consisted of twelve stages covering  with a further eight stages on the Saturday covering . The top four protagonists of the IRC; Juho Hänninen, Jan Kopecký, Bruno Magalhães and Kris Meeke took part in the event, while Guy Wilks did not take part due to an injury sustained at the Rally d'Italia Sardegna.

Results
Freddy Loix joined Juho Hänninen as a two-time winner in the 2010 IRC season with victory in Madeira, with a comfortable victory of nearly 40 seconds over Jan Kopecký. His victory, the fifth of his IRC career, tied the record of Kris Meeke for number of victories in the series. Loix, who claimed fourteen stage victories during the event, fought off the challenges of the other Škodas, Luca Rossetti's Abarth and Meeke's Peugeot. Rossetti crashed out of the event during the second run through the Cidade de Santana stage, while Meeke retired on stage 17 due to a mechanical problem, two stages after breaking an alternator belt. Behind Loix and Kopecký, Hänninen finished third but still holds a seven-point lead over Kopecký in the championship.

Overall

Special stages

References

External links 
 The official website for the rally
 The official website of the Intercontinental Rally Challenge

Madeira
Rally Madeira
Rali Vinho da Madeira